The Halegan gas field is an Iranian natural gas field that was discovered in 2010. It began production in 2010 and produces natural gas and condensates. The total proven reserves of the Halegan gas field are around 12.4 trillion cubic feet (355×109m3) and production is slated to be around 500 million cubic feet/day (14.2×106m3).

References

Natural gas fields in Iran